Baby Glacier may refer to:

Baby Glacier (Alaska) located in College Fjord, U.S. state of Alaska
Baby Glacier (Canada) located in the Arctic archipelago of Canada
Baby Glacier (Montana) located in Glacier National Park (U.S.), U.S. state of Montana
Baby Glacier (Wyoming) located in the Wind River Range, U.S. state of Wyoming